A currency future, also known as an FX future or a foreign exchange future, is a futures contract to exchange one currency for another at a specified date in the future at a price (exchange rate) that is fixed on the purchase date; see Foreign exchange derivative. Typically, one of the currencies is the US dollar. The price of a future is then in terms of US dollars per unit of other currency. This can be different from the standard way of quoting in the spot foreign exchange markets. The trade unit of each contract is then a certain amount of other currency, for instance €125,000. Most contracts have physical delivery, so for those held at the end of the last trading day, actual payments are made in each currency. However, most contracts are closed out before that. Investors can close out the contract at any time prior to the contract's delivery date.

History
Currency futures were first created in 1970 at the International Commercial Exchange in New York.  But the contracts did not "take off" because the Bretton Woods system was still in effect.  On 15 August 1971, President Richard Nixon abandoned both the gold standard and the system of fixed exchange rates.  Some commodity traders at the Chicago Mercantile Exchange (CME) did not have access to the inter-bank exchange markets in the early 1970s, when they believed that significant changes were about to take place in the currency market.  The CME established the International Monetary Market (IMM) and launched trading in seven currency futures on May 16, 1972.

The CME actually now gives credit to the International Commercial Exchange (not to be confused with  ICE) for creating the currency contract, and state that they came up with the idea  independently of the International Commercial Exchange.   Today, the IMM is a division of CME. In the fourth quarter of 2009, CME Group FX volume averaged 754,000 contracts per day, reflecting average daily notional value of approximately $100 billion. Currently most of these are traded electronically.

Other futures exchanges that trade currency futures are Euronext.liffe and Intercontinental Exchange .

Terms 
For currency futures traded on the CME the conventional maturity dates are the IMM dates, namely the third Wednesday in March, June, September and December.  The conventional option maturity dates are the first Friday after the first Wednesday for the given month.

More recently, serial months have been added.  For instance, EUR/USD terms are now 20 consecutive quarters (5 years) plus 3 serial contract months.

Uses

Hedging
Investors use these futures contracts to hedge against foreign exchange risk. If an investor will receive a cashflow denominated in a foreign currency on some future date, that investor can lock in the current exchange rate by entering into an offsetting currency futures position that expires on the date of the cashflow.

For example, Jane is a US-based investor who will receive €1,000,000 on December 1. She can lock in this exchange rate by selling €1,000,000 worth of futures contracts expiring on December 1. That way, she is guaranteed an exchange rate of  regardless of exchange rate fluctuations in the meantime.

Speculation
Currency futures can also be used to speculate and, by incurring a risk, attempt to profit from rising or falling exchange rates.

As with any future, this is paid to him immediately.

See also
List of finance topics
Forward contract
Foreign exchange market
Foreign exchange derivative
Currency swap

External links
 Quandl: Currencies Futures - free, historical data in CSV, Excel, JSON or XML
 Currency Futures Contract Specifications and Tick Values at ExcelTradingModels.com

References

Derivatives (finance)

it:Future#Currency future